The Ashburton Shield is an historic trophy for rifle shooting in the United Kingdom. It is awarded annually to the winning team-of-8 at the Schools Imperial Meeting, held by the National Rifle Association at Bisley. The competition is open to teams of cadets from (predominantly) Combined Cadet Force units based in public and private schools. A separate competition is held the week prior for cadet units not attached to a school (such as the Army Cadet Force), as part of the Inter-Services Cadet Rifle Meeting (ISCRM).

History
The Ashburton Shield was presented by Lord Ashburton in 1861 for competition between the Junior Officers' Training Corps that were run within public schools. This remained the case until the 1948 merger of school cadet units into the Combined Cadet Force. It was first contested at the National Rifle Association's second Imperial Meeting. It was mentioned by Edward Walford in 1878 when he wrote of the Meeting, then at Wimbledon:

The Meeting is considered the pinnacle of inter-school shooting in the UK, and British Pathe featured the event in multiple newsreels.

The Schools Meeting is held annually, with the exception of 2020 and 2021, when the Schools Meeting was placed in abeyance due to the COVID-19 pandemic.

Epsom College hold the record for the most wins, at 15.

Notable winners include 2018 ISSF World Champion Seonaid McIntosh, who was a member of the 2013 winning team from Dollar Academy. McIntosh individually won the Schools Hundred competition.

Results

References

Sports trophies and awards
Rifle shooting sports
Shooting competitions
Shooting competitions in the United Kingdom
Recurring events established in 1861
National Rifle Association (United Kingdom)
Target shooting trophies and awards